Diego Dominguez (born 25 April 1966 in Córdoba, Argentina) is a former Argentine rugby union fly-half who played for Argentina and Italy, winning 74 caps for the latter.

In 1988, Dominguez toured France with the Argentine national team, and in 1989 he scored 27 points in two games for Argentina against Chile and Paraguay. Because of the little opportunities, he decided that he would turn to Italy, his grandmother's homeland. After the tour with Argentina, he played for a year in France, and then moved to Milan in Italy.

Dominguez then made his Italian debut in March 1991 against France. Dominguez played for the Azzurri at fly-half in three world cups in 1991, 1995 and 1999. He is one of only nine players (Dan Carter, Jonny Wilkinson, Ronan O'Gara, Neil Jenkins, Owen Farrell, Johnny Sexton, Jimmy Gopperth and Florin Vlaicu) in history to have scored more than 1,000 points.

In 1997 he moved to Stade Français and was part of the French champions' 1998 side. Stade also reached the final of the Heineken Cup in 2001 but despite Dominguez kicking 30 points, they lost to Leicester Tigers.

He announced his retirement in 2000 but was persuaded to return as there was no heir apparent. He played his last game for Italy on 22 February 2003 against Ireland.

Honours
 Stade Français
French Rugby Union Championship/Top 14: 1997–98, 1999–2000, 2002–03, 2003–04

References

External links
Planet-Rugby Argentina stats
Planet-rugby stats for Italy and biography

1966 births
Living people
Argentine rugby union players
Italian rugby union players
Rugby union fly-halves
Sportspeople from Córdoba, Argentina
Italian sportspeople of Argentine descent
Stade Français players
Italy international rugby union players
Argentina international rugby union players